The Zimbabwe women's national field hockey team is the national women's team representing Zimbabwe in field hockey.

It won the gold medal at the 1980 Summer Olympics in Moscow, USSR, the first female Olympic tournament. Zimbabwe also won the inaugural Hockey African Cup for Nations they hosted in 1990, followed by a silver medal in 1994 and a bronze in 1998.

Tournament record

Summer Olympics
1980 –

Africa Cup of Nations
1990 – 
1994 – 
1998 – 
2022 – 4th

African Games
1995 – 
1999 – 
2003 – 5th
2023 - Qualified

African Olympic Qualifier
2007 – 5th
2011 – 4th
2015 – 5th
2019 –

FIH Hockey Series
2018–19 – First round

See also
Zimbabwe men's national field hockey team

References

 
African women's national field hockey teams
National